Sparganothina neoamoebaea is a species of moth of the family Tortricidae. It is found in Jalisco, Mexico.

The length of the forewings is 5.8-6.3 mm for males and 6.5-7.3 mm for females. The forewings are silvery white with blackish-brown markings and dispersed dark brown, orange or cream coloured scales. The hindwings are pale greyish brown with thin darker brown lines toward the apex.

Etymology
The species name refers to the habitus similarity between this species and Sparganothina amoebaea, with the Greek prefix neos (meaning new).

References

Moths described in 2001
Sparganothini